This page provides a list of oldest brands and companies operating only in the eyewear manufacturing business to date and in any country. "Eyewear", although being a relative modern terminology, refers to the category of all items and accessories worn over the eyes for fashion adornment, protection against the environment and medical issues, which include glasses (also called eyeglasses or spectacles) and sunglasses. To be listed, a brand or company name must manufacture and sell its own eyewear products and remain operating, either in whole or in part, since inception. Generic optical stores, retailers and factories are not included in the list.

List of oldest eyewear companies

References

Eyewear companies
Economy-related lists of superlatives
Eyewear, oldest
Eyewear, oldest
Eyewear companies